Sister San Sulpicio (Spanish:La hermana San Sulpicio) is a 1934 Spanish comedy film directed by Florián Rey and starring Imperio Argentina, Miguel Ligero and Salvador Soler Marí. It is a remake of Rey's 1927 silent film Sister San Sulpicio which had been based on Armando Palacio Valdés's novel of the same title.

It was made by CIFESA, Spain's largest studio of the era.

Cast
 Imperio Argentina as Gloria / Hermana San Sulpicio  
 Miguel Ligero as Daniel Suárez  
 Salvador Soler Marí as Ceferino Sanjurjo  
 Rosita Lacasa as Isabel  
 Ana Adamuz as Paca  
 Luis Martínez Tovar as Don Óscar  
 Mari Paz Molinero
 Emilio Portes
 María Anaya as Madre Florentina  
 Enrique Vico
 Juan Calvo as Hombre que pide otra copla  
 Cándida Folgado
 Nicolás D. Perchicot as Señor Paco  
 Olga Romero

References

Bibliography
 Goble, Alan. The Complete Index to Literary Sources in Film. Walter de Gruyter, 1 Jan 1999.

External links 

1934 films
Spanish comedy films
1934 comedy films
1930s Spanish-language films
Films directed by Florián Rey
Films based on Spanish novels
Sound film remakes of silent films
Remakes of Spanish films
Spanish black-and-white films